Sambhu Nath Shukla was a noted Indian politician and Indian independence activist. He was a member of the Indian National Congress party in Madhya Pradesh. He was a member of the Indian Constituent Assembly, the Provisional Parliament and the Rajya Sabha between 1952 and 1960. He became the Chief Minister of Vindhya Pradesh from 13 March 1952 to 31 October 1956 until house dissolved and Vindhya Pradesh became part of Madhya Pradesh.
He also worked as minister of forest ministry in the government of    Pandit Ravishankar Shukla. He was also elected as mp(1967-1971) from Rewa. The autonomous degree college (Pt. S.N. Shukla University) of Shahdol was named after him which is now a university.

References

Indian independence activists from Madhya Pradesh
Members of the Constituent Assembly of India
Rajya Sabha members from Madhya Pradesh
Vindhya Pradesh MLAs 1951–1956
Vindhya Pradesh politicians
Indian National Congress politicians
Chief ministers from Indian National Congress
Indian National Congress politicians from Madhya Pradesh